Guengat is a commune in the Finistère department of Brittany in northwestern France.

Population
Inhabitants of Guengat are called in French Guengatais.

See also
Communes of the Finistère department

References

External links

Mayors of Finistère Association 

Communes of Finistère